Labola Koumoussanra is a village in the Tiéfora Department of Comoé Province in south-western Burkina Faso. The village has a population of 453.

References

Populated places in the Cascades Region
Comoé Province